Events from the year 1744 in Scotland.

Incumbents 

 Secretary of State for Scotland: The Marquess of Tweeddale

Law officers 
 Lord Advocate – Robert Craigie
 Solicitor General for Scotland – Robert Dundas, the younger

Judiciary 
 Lord President of the Court of Session – Lord Culloden
 Lord Justice General – Lord Ilay
 Lord Justice Clerk – Lord Milton

Events 
 The Honourable Company of Edinburgh Golfers established on Leith Links.
 Possible date – Edinburgh Skating Club established.

Births 
 13 February – David Allan, genre painter (died 1796)
 6 October – James McGill, entrepreneur and philanthropist in Canada (died 1813 in Canada)
 17 October – Andrew Duncan, physician (died 1828)
 31 October – James Craig, architect, planner of the New Town, Edinburgh (died 1795)

Deaths 
 28 January – Thomas Innes, Catholic priest and historian (born 1662; died in France)
 2 March – William Maxwell, 5th Earl of Nithsdale, Jacobite (born 1676; died in Italy)

See also 

 Timeline of Scottish history

References 

 
Years of the 18th century in Scotland
Scotland
1740s in Scotland